Arthur Thompson (15 June 1922 – July 1996) is a former professional footballer, who played for Huddersfield Town. He was born in Dewsbury.

References

Notes 

1922 births
1996 deaths
Association football forwards
English Football League players
English footballers
Footballers from Dewsbury
Huddersfield Town A.F.C. players